Kokhav Nolad 10 is the tenth season of the reality show Kokhav Nolad, which focuses on finding the next Israeli pop star. It was hosted by Tzvika Hadar with judges Miri Messika, Tsedi Tzarfati and the newest Moshe Peretz and Gidi Gov. The final of Kokhav Nolad 10 took place in Haifa on September 4, 2012.

Participants

External links
Official website 

Kokhav Nolad seasons